Dr. T's Music Software was a software company based in Massachusetts. Development was started in 1984 by Emile Tobenfeld. The company operated until the mid-1990s, and developed music software for the Commodore 64, Commodore 128, Commodore Amiga, Macintosh and mainly the Atari ST.

Products

Software
Hitman - cue sheets
X-oR (Amiga, Atari, Macintosh) - patch editor
Tunesmith - composing
Tiger Cub (Atari ST) - sequencer
Tiger - sequencer
Samplemaker - sample editor
Realtime 1.2 - sequencer
Music Mouse - composing
Midi Recording Studio (Atari ST, Amiga) - sequencer
M - composing
Keys! - composing
KCS - sequencer (Commodore 64/128, Amiga)
KCS Omega - Keyboard Controlled Sequencer
Tempo Master MPE
Fingers - composing
Copyist Professional (Amiga) - scoring
Copyist Apprentice (Amiga) - scoring
Algorithmic Composer (Commodore 64/128) - algorithmic composition
Echo Plus
Convertifile Plus
T-Basic (Atari) - BASIC programming

Patch editors for:
Roland MT-32
Roland D-110
Oberheim Matrix 6/1000
Lexicon PCM-70
Korg M1
Korg DS-8
Korg DP3000
Kawai K5
Kawai K3
Kawai K1
FX-Pac-1
Caged Artist - Roland D-50
4-op Deluxe
ESQ-apade - Ensoniq ESQ1/Ensoniq SQ80
E-mu Proteus/XR
DX/TX Heaven
Casio VZ Rider
Casio CZ Rider
VDS - Ensoniq Mirage

Hardware
Model-A (Amiga 500/1000) - MIDI interface
Model-T (Commodore 64/128) - MIDI interface
Phantom - MIDI interface/SMPTE synchroniser

References

Further reading

Defunct software companies of the United States